Sunny Brae is a neighbourhood in Moncton, New Brunswick.

History
In 1867, Sunny Brae existed as farm land with perhaps as few as two houses in the area. One of the earliest settlers in Sunny Brae was Alexander Wright who came from Scotland and it was suggested that he gave it the name "Sunny Brae".  In the 1870s, Rev. Stephen Humphrey owned most of the farmland and it was subdivided into lots known as the Russell survey. The lots were gradually taken up by settlers. A church bearing the Humphrey name currently serves the area, and has for many decades. 

In 1904, Sunny Brae was a community with a post office, two stores and a population of 200.

Sunny Brae was an incorporated as a township from 1915 to 1954,  when it amalgamated with the city of Moncton.  It now exists as a neighbourhood, with no markings to suggest its name or borders.  

The neighborhood is served by the bus line 61 Elmwood of Codiac Transpo. 

Today Sunny Brae is among the oldest established neighbourhoods in the city. Located within it is a middle school bearing its name, which was founded in the late 1950s.

Bordering communities

See also

Sunny Brae North, New Brunswick

References

Neighbourhoods in Moncton